Graciosa Airport (Portuguese: Aérodromo da Graciosa)  is an airport located  west northwest of Santa Cruz da Graciosa on Graciosa Island in the Azores .

Airlines and destinations
The following airlines operate regular scheduled and charter flights at Graciosa Airport:

Statistics

See also
Aviation in the Azores

References

Airports in the Azores
Buildings and structures in Santa Cruz da Graciosa